Gamera 2000 is a video game developed by Surveyor Corp. and released by Daiei Digital Entertainment for the PlayStation. The game features the giant monster character Gamera, and was released in Japan on April 25, 1997.

Gameplay 
The gameplay of Gamera 2000 is very similar to Panzer Dragoon. The game features eight levels in total.

Development 
The game was released in Japan on April 25, 1997 in Japan for the Sony PlayStation and published by Datai Digital Entertainment. Publisher THQ had expressed some interest in releasing it in North America; however, the game was never published outside of Japan.

Reception 

Famitsu gave the game a 27 out of 40 score.

Gamespot gave the game 7.5 out of 10.

GameFan gave it scores of 89, 90, and 80.

Super GamePower gave it a 4 out of 5.

References

External links 
Gamera 2000 at MobyGames

1997 video games
Japan-exclusive video games
Kaiju video games
Multiplayer and single-player video games
PlayStation (console) games
PlayStation (console)-only games
Video games developed in Japan
Video games scored by Masahiko Takaki